Noel is a South Korean boy band consisting of Jeon Woo-sung, Lee Sang-gon, Na Sung-ho and Kang Kyun-sung.

Discography

Studio albums

Extended plays

Single albums

Singles

Awards and nominations

References

External links
 

JYP Entertainment artists
K-pop music groups
South Korean boy bands
South Korean contemporary R&B musical groups
South Korean pop music groups